Incaspis amaru is a species of snake in the family Colubridae.  The species is native to Ecuador.

References

Incaspis
Snakes of South America
Reptiles of Ecuador
Endemic fauna of Ecuador
Reptiles described in 2014